James F. Pankow (born 1951) is an American environmental engineer.

Pankow studied chemistry at the State University of New York at Binghamton (1973) and earned a doctorate in engineering from the California Institute of Technology (1979). He is a professor of chemistry and engineering at Portland State University. Pankow has been an ISI highly cited researcher since 2003. In 2009, Pankow was elected a member of the United States National Academy of Engineering "for  contributions to understanding the chemical thermodynamics of organic particulate matter in urban air and the global atmosphere."

References

1951 births
Living people
Environmental engineers
20th-century American engineers
21st-century American engineers
Portland State University faculty
Binghamton University alumni
California Institute of Technology alumni
Members of the United States National Academy of Engineering